Bengt Cederwall (born 15 January 1929) is a Swedish curler.

From 1973 to 1987 he was a board member of the Swedish Curling Association.

Teams

Personal life

References

External links
 
Air Canada Silver Broom 1976 World Curling Championship - Perfect Duluth Day

Possibly living people
1929 births
Swedish male curlers
20th-century Swedish people